Anik Bissonnette OC CQ (born February 9, 1962) is a Canadian ballet dancer, who started her professional ballet career with the Ballet de Montreal Eddy Toussaint in the 1980s and was a principal dancer starting in 1990 with Les Grands Ballets Canadiens. Her father, Jean Bissonnette, was a famoustelevision director with Télévision de Radio-Canada.

Career

Training 
Bissonnette first began her training in ballet at age 10, at the studios of Ludmilla Chiriaeff, Les Grands' founder, but dropped out after six months. She took up jazz, and danced at the École de danse Eddy Toussaint, primarily under Camilla Malashenko. Toussaint offered her a scholarship under the condition that she take classes in classical ballet; Bissonnette agreed.

Le Ballet de Montréal Eddy Toussaint 
In 1979, at age 17, she joined Toussaint's troupe, Le Ballet de Montréal Eddy Toussaint. She created many leading roles in Toussaint's choreographies, including Rose La Tulipe (1979), Un simple moment (1981), Requiem de Mozart (1986), New World Symphony (1987), and Bonjour Brel (1988).

Under Toussaint's artistic direction, Bissonnette formed a memorable partnership with Louis Robitaille. She starred in many televised productions with Le Ballet de Montréal Eddy Toussaint and performed in Night Magic, a film directed by Lewis Furey. Her participation in the 1984 Helsinki Ballet Competition netted Toussaint first prize for his choreography in Un simple moment.

She danced the role of Giselle for the first time in Odesa, Ukraine, USSR, in 1988. The following year, she was invited to Toulouse France where she danced the part of Odette/Odile in Swan Lake with Laurent Hilaire the principal dancer with the Opéra de Paris. She also danced the role of Juliet in Nicholas Beriozoff's Romeo and Juliet as well as Cinderella in a work of the same name.

Les Grands Ballets Canadiens 
In 1989, Bissonnette joined Les Grands Ballets Canadiens in Montréal, Canada and was named principal dancer the following year, thus, gaining access to roles that showcased the full range of her enormous talent. Leading roles in great classics like The Nutcracker, Coppélia, La Fille Mal Gardée, Les Sylphides, Giselle, and Swan Lake allowed audiences to appreciate her versatility. She performed the dramatic principal roles in Antony Tudor's Jardin aux Lilas and Pillar of Fire and José Limón's Moor's Pavane. She has also performed in some 10 ballets by George Balanchine.

In 1991, she resumed the role of Giselle and was partnered with Éric Vu An, another Paris Opera étoile.

Bissonnette left the company in 1996.

Throughout her career with Les Grands, Bissonnette has worked with such choreographers as James Kudelka, William Forsythe, Jiri Kylian, Ohad Naharin, Nacho Duato, Nils Christe, Susan Toumine, and Hans van Manen. Montréal choreographer Ginette Laurin and several up-and-coming choreographers (including Kevin O'Day, Gioconda Barbuto, Septim Webre, Didy Veldman, and Stijn Celis) have also had the pleasure of working with her. 

In 2001, she created the role of Lisa in Kim Brandstrup's La Dame de pique.

Bissonnette performs regularly in galas in many cities around the world: Melbourne, Athens, Prague, Budapest, Thessaloniki, Montréal, New York City, Toronto, Vienna, Spoleto (Italy), Helsinki, Bratislava. 

In 2005, she was invited by Carla Fracci of Rome's teatro dell'Opera to revive the ballet La Chatte, which Les Grands Ballets Canadiens de Montréal had staged for her in 1990. She performed in Vienna for the closing of Tanz für Europa.

She retired from the company in 2007.

Leadership 
In tandem with her stage career, Bissonnette is Artistic Director of the Festival des Arts de Saint-Sauveur and President of the Regroupement québécois de la danse. 

Bissonnette has helped organize Montreal's Festival Quartiers Danses.

Personal life 
Bissonnette was partners with Louis Robitaille for almost 20 years before divorcing in 2001. has one daughter, who attended l'École supérieure de danse.

Awards and honours

 1985: Best individual Performance at the International de Danse Porsche du Canada.
 1985: Personality of the week by La Presse
 1988: Personality of the year, Youth section by the Salon de la Femme de Montréal
 1990: Prix des Biches (awarded on the Radio-Canada television show La Bande des Six)
 1995: Officer of the Order of Canada
 1996: Chevalier de l'Ordre du Québec
 2005: Awarded the Prix du public at the Budapest Ballet Gala
 2007: Awarded the Prix du public at the Budapest Ballet Gala
 2014: Governor General's Performing Arts Award for Lifetime Artistic Achievement

References

External links 
 Anik Bissonnette at The Canadian Encyclopedia

1962 births
Living people
Canadian ballerinas
Canadian female dancers
Knights of the National Order of Quebec
Officers of the Order of Canada
People from Montreal
Prix Denise-Pelletier winners
Governor General's Performing Arts Award winners